Ramón Gabilondo Alberdi (15 March 1913 – 16 September 2004) was a Spanish footballer who played as a midfielder.

In a career interrupted by the Spanish Civil War, he won La Liga twice in a row with Atlético Madrid in 1939-40 and 1940-41. He also won 5 caps for Spain and was later joint head coach of the national team in 1960.

External links
 
 
 

1913 births
2004 deaths
Spanish footballers
Footballers from Eibar
Association football midfielders
La Liga players
SD Eibar footballers
Real Valladolid players
Atlético Madrid footballers
Spain international footballers
Spanish football managers
Spain national under-21 football team managers
Spain national football team managers
Tercera División players